Mihail Georgiev Savov (14 November 1857 in Stara Zagora - 21 July 1928 in Saint-Vallier-de-Thiey, France) was a Bulgarian general, twice Minister of Defence (1891–1894 and 1903–1907), second in command of the Bulgarian army during the Balkan Wars.

He was twice dismissed from the army and twice reassigned with the help of Tsar Ferdinand. Mihail Savov and Ferdinand are considered the main characters responsible for the Second Balkan War.

Biography
Mihail Savov was born on 14 November (26 November NS) 1859 in Eski Zagra (Stara Zagora), at that time under Ottoman rule. He studied in Hasköy (Haskovo), Filibe (Plovdiv), in the Aprilov National High School in Gabrovo and then in the Imperial lyceum Galatasaray in Istanbul (1876).

He graduated the Military School in Sofia in 1879 as lieutenant. On 9 July 1881 he was promoted to first lieutenant and then continued his education in the Nicolas General Staff Academy in Saint Petersburg (1881–1885).

After his return to Bulgaria, he was appointed in the Eastern Rumelia militia. On 9 September 1885 he was promoted to captain and with Order №4 of Knyaz Alexander Batenberg in the same day he was appointed for adjutant in the army.

Serbo-Bulgarian War
During the Serbo-Bulgarian War in 1885 he was appointed as head of one of the departments of the Ministry of Defence and commanded the left flank during the battle of Slivnitsa. He had contributions for the defeat of the Serbian Morava Division and the successful battle of Pirot. He was awarded with Order of Bravery III grade.

In 1886, he participated in the commission for the settlement of the Bulgarian-Ottoman border in the Rhodope Mountains and served in the headquarters of the Minister of Defence. Between 1886 and 1887 he was assistant of the Defence Minister. On 17 April 1887 he was promoted to major and worked in the Department of the General Stuff as officer in the 5th infantry brigade.

In 1887 Mihail Savov was appointed for Fligel Adjutant of Knyaz Ferdinand. On 16 February he became Minister of Defence in the cabinet of Stefan Stambolov and on 2 August in the same year was promoted to lieutenant colonel. After the fall of Stambolov in 1894, he was dismissed from the army, but in 1897 his position was restored and he became director of the Military School until 1903. On 1 January 1899 he was promoted to colonel.

Between 1903 and 1908 Savov was again Minister of Defence in the third cabinet of Stoyan Danev, in the second cabinet of Racho Petrov and in the cabinets of Dimitar Petkov, Dimitar Stanchov and Petar Gudev. On 1 January 1904 he was promoted to major general. In 1907 he was charged for corruption and malpractice with the supply of weapons.

On 30 October 1908 he was promoted to lieutenant general and left the army for the second time.

Balkan Wars
After the First Balkan War broke out in 1912 General Savov was restored on service and was appointed on the newly created position Assistant of the Commander (Tsar Ferdinand). On his orders the Bulgarian army attacked the Ottoman defense lines at Chatalja despite the fact that the Bulgarians were outnumbered, the over-stretched supply-lines and the cholera epidemic among the soldiers. He also issued the attack against the Serb and Greek armies which flamed the Second Balkan War in 1913.

On 29 June 1913 he was put in command of the united 4th and 5th Armies and on 14 July 2nd Army was also joined. He was one of the commanders in the battle of Kresna Gorge. After the war he was again dismissed trialed by the State Court in 1914.

In the next years Mihail Savov lived in France. After the First World War he became Minister Phenipotentiary in France (1920–1923) and Belgium (1922–1923).

Lieutenant General Mihail Savov died on 21 July 1928 in Saint-Vallier-de-Thiey in France and was buried on 18 August in Sofia.

Awards
Order of Bravery, II grade; III grade
Order of St Alexander, I and II grade with brilliants
Order of Military Merit, I grade
 Order of Stara Planina, 1st grade with swords - awarded posthumously on 20 December 2012

Footnotes

Sources

 Недев, С., Командването на българската войска през войните за национално обединение, София, 1993, Военноиздателски комплекс „Св. Георги Победоносец“, стр. 56
 Димитров, И., Съединението 1885 - енциклопедичен справочник, София, 1985, Държавно издателство „д-р Петър Берон“, стр. 182

Bulgarian generals
Bulgarian military personnel of the Balkan Wars
Recipients of the Order of Bravery
Recipients of the Order of Military Merit (Bulgaria)
People from Stara Zagora
People of the Serbo-Bulgarian War
Bulgarian expatriates in France
1857 births
1928 deaths
Burials at Central Sofia Cemetery
Defence ministers of Bulgaria